Normanton railway station serves the town of Normanton in West Yorkshire, England.

History
The original station was opened by the North Midland Railway (NMR) on 30 June 1840 (this was one day before nearby Castleford Railway Station which opened on 1 July 1840) on their main line towards Leeds, creating an interchange station between the North Midland Railway (NMR), the York and North Midland Railway (Y&NMR) and the Manchester and Leeds Railway (M&LR) - establishing a three company junction.

It became the focus of several railway lines in the mid-19th century. Construction began in 1837 under the supervision of George Stephenson for the North Midland. This was soon followed by an addition from the York and Midland Railway and then by the Manchester and Leeds line which all joined at Normanton thereby giving the town access to much of the country. The M&LR route between Normanton and  followed, opening on 5 October 1840, and on 1 March 1841, the final section of the M&LR route to Manchester was opened. The Leeds and Manchester lines crossed a  stretch across the Pennines and at the time boasted the world's longest railway station platform at Normanton – a quarter of a mile (400m) long.

In Victorian times Normanton station was one of the most important stations in northern England and can boast that Queen Victoria stopped over in The Station Hotel. The town also served as an important part of the transport infrastructure for national and local industries including coal and bricks, although most of this was lost during the 1950s and 1960s with the last remaining operational brickworks eventually closing in the mid-nineties. There were three brickworks in town and were all built within the small area known as Newland, taking advantage of the abundance of clay from the area. A fourth works was founded in the 1890s by a man named Thomas Kirk from Nottingham who had heard rumours that Normanton was rapidly turning into an important junction on the railways. Both Kirk and his sons used their life savings and formed the Normanton Brick Company at nearby Altofts which is still in operation today.
 

The station lost many of its services in the aftermath of the Beeching Report, with both express and local trains on the NMR main line ceasing to call in 1968 and trains to York ending in 1970, leaving only Hallam Line trains to serve the station.  The NMR was closed completely in 1988 south of the former Goose Hill Junction (where it diverged from the M&L line to Wakefield) although part of the route further south remains open to serve a glassworks at Monk Bretton, near Barnsley. This has led to much of the railway infrastructure here becoming redundant and being removed - the main buildings have been demolished, the sidings and goods lines lifted, the bay platforms filled in and the main island shortened considerably. The old Station Hotel still stands, but it has been converted into residential apartments.

Facilities
The station is unstaffed, but a self-service ticket machine is provided (located near the footbridge) to allow passengers to purchase tickets before boarding or collect pre-paid tickets.  There are two waiting shelters, along with digital display screens, timetable posters and an automated announcement system to offer train running information.  Step-free access to both platforms is available via ramps on the footbridge from the entrance and car park.

Services

On Mondays to Saturdays the station receives an hourly service to Leeds via  and to  via , with extra trains during peak times. On Sundays there is a two-hourly service each way.

A limited service (3 trains per day each way) from  also calls here Monday to Saturday since the May 2019 timetable change; this runs via Wakefield Kirkgate and continues to/from Castleford.

Notes

References

Body, G. (1988), PSL Field Guides - Railways of the Eastern Region Volume 2, Patrick Stephens Ltd, Wellingborough,

External links

Photo of the station in 1985, prior to the demolition of the main buildings

Railway stations in Wakefield
DfT Category F1 stations
Former Midland Railway stations
Railway stations in Great Britain opened in 1840
Northern franchise railway stations
George Townsend Andrews railway stations
Normanton, West Yorkshire